Pothapuram is a village in the Krishnagiri district of the state of Tamil Nadu, in India. The postal code of Pothapuram is 635112.

Schools 
Government Primary School established in 1954 that is managed by the local body. The school caters for grades 1 to 8. It is co-educational and it doesn't have an attached pre-primary section. The language used in the school is Tamil. The school has a library with 1077 books. A midday meal is provided and prepared on the premises.

Societies
REST Society for Research International is located at 292, TNHB Colony, Pothapuram, Krishnagiri, Tamil Nadu, India

References 

Villages in Krishnagiri district